Glacialisaurus is a genus of sauropodomorph dinosaur. It lived during the Pliensbachian stage of the Early Jurassic period around 186 to 182 million years ago in what is now the central region of the Transantarctic Mountains of Antarctica. It is known from two specimens; the holotype (name-bearing specimen), a partial tarsus (ankle) and metatarsus, and a partial left femur. The fossils were collected by a team led by paleontologist William R. Hammer during a 1990–91 field expedition to the Hanson Formation of Antarctica. They were described in 2007, and made the basis of the new genus and species Glacialisaurus hammeri. The genus name translates as “icy” or "frozen lizard”, and the species name honors Hammer. 

This dinosaur has been classified as a massospondylid, a group of medium-sized, basal (early diverging or "primitive") sauropodomorphs that existed during the Late Triassic and Early Jurassic on every continent except Australia. Glacialisaurus was a large herbivorous dinosaur, though it was average sized for a massospondylid. Glacialisaurus was distinct from other sauropodomorphs in features such as having a robust medial epicondylar ridge on the lower femur, a robust adductor ridge extending from the upper end of the femoral medial condyle, and a second metatarsal with a front border that is weakly convex in the upper end.

Discovery and naming 

Fossils of a sauropodomorph dinosaur were discovered by a field team from Augustana College led by paleontologist William R. Hammer during 1990–91 fieldwork in the lower Hanson Formation of Mount Kirkpatrick in the Central Transantarctic Mountains of Antarctica, dating to the Early Jurassic. The fossils were from two different individuals: elements of the right ankle and metatarsus such as the astragalus, two tarsals and four metatarsals preserved in articulation (specimen FMNH PR1823), and the lower part of a left femur (FMNH PR1822, a thigh bone), ending just after the dissipation of the medial epicondylar crest.  

The fossils were sent to the Field Museum of Natural History in Chicago, USA, and were first reported in 1994. This report speculated that cervical vertebrae from Cryolophosaurus found nearby were also from the sauropodomorph, but this has since been disproven. 

The fossils were described by the paleontologists Nathan Smith and Diego Pol, who named the new genus and species Glacialisaurus hammeri, with FMNH PR1823 as holotype specimen. The generic name is derived from the Latin root glacialis meaning “icy” after its discovery in the Beardmore Glacier region in the Central Transantarctic Mountains and the word sauros meaning “lizard”. The specific name honors Hammer for his contributions to Antarctic paleontology.

Description 

While few remains are known of Glacialisaurus, its leg bones show it was a robust basal (early diverging or "primitive") sauropodomorph. As a basal sauropodomorph, Glacialisaurus would have had a long neck and a proportionally small head with leaf-shaped teeth. The hand would have been short, wide, and robust with a large claw on the thumb.

Leg bones

The cross-section of the robust femoral shaft is slightly wider from side to side than from front to back, though not as extreme as in eusauropods. The medial epicondylar crest extends from the medial surface of the lower femoral shaft and is distinct from all other sauropodomorphs in that it is robust, a trait convergently evolved in basal theropods. The front surface of the femur is flat instead of convex from side to side, a feature shared with other basal sauropodomorphs. The top surface of the upper femur lacks any anterior extensor groove. At the lower end, the lateral and medial condyles are separated by a craniocaudal groove that ends abruptly with a popliteal fossa (opening in the bone). Glacialisaurus is also distinguished by its robust adductor ridge extending from the upper end of the femoral medial condyle. This ridge starts at the end of the medial condyle and is kidney-shaped with a long axis spanning proximolateral−distomedially.

The astragalus is weakly convex at the lower end, though this is not as extreme as in Blikanasaurus and Lessemsaurus. The upper surface of the astragalus is softly convex because it is where the lower end of the tibia (shin bone) articulates with the astragalus. This surface is pierced by two fossae (small openings in bone) that have been interpreted as vascular fossae. The ascending process (protrusion of bone) is mound shaped and its upper articular surface faces proximomedially. The distal tarsals have a laterally elongated triangular shape in when seen from their top ends. The corners of the tarsals are rounded and bulbous, especially in the posteromedial corner. The medial distal tarsal is not confined solely to metatarsal III, but also barely contacts the proximal end of metatarsal II, like in Saturnalia. The lateral distal tarsal has a quadrangular shape and was likely longer mediolaterally than proximodistally. 

Metatarsal I is roughly 3/4 the length of metatarsal II, as in most basal sauropodomorphs. Metatarsal I has a broad and short shaft that is ellipse shaped, more so than in most other basal sauropodomorphs. The upper portion of the small posterior groove separating the two distal condyles is similar to that of Plateosaurus. The medial condyle is less robust and more proximally positioned than the lateral one. This would cause a medial displacement of the first digit, a characteristic in most saurischian dinosaurs (the group that includes sauropodomorphs and theropods). The upper end of metatarsal II is hourglass-shaped and has concave medial-lateral ends to articulate with the other metatarsals. The medial concavity is well developed, but the lateral concavity is less so.

The diagnostic traits (characteristics that distinguish a taxon from others) of the second metatarsals include: a front border that is weakly convex in proximal aspect; a hypertrophied lateral plantar flange on the proximal end (present, but less developed in many basal sauropodomorphs, e.g., Saturnalia, Plateosaurus); and a medial distal condyle that is more robust and well−developed than the lateral distal condyle. The third metatarsal lacks much preserved detail, but has a trapezoidal upper end with a straight to concave front border and a slightly convex medial border for articulation with metatarsal II. The hind edge is narrower from side toside than the front one, but is not acute or rounded, causing the upper outline of metatarsal III to be almost trapezoidal, as in Lufengosaurus, Gyposaurus, and Coloradisaurus. On the contrary, most non-eusauropod sauropodomorphs have almost triangular upper outlines. Only the upper portion of the metatarsal IV is preserved, but preserves an upper outline akin to that of Lufengosaurus that has a broad anterior face and a finger−like posteromedial projection. This finger-like process is slightly convex and would have articulated with metatarsal III.

Classification 

The phylogenetic position of Glacialisaurus is unstable due to its fragmentary nature, but it is frequently found to be a member of the family Massospondylidae. Massospondylids are a group of non-eusauropod sauropodomorphs that existed during the Late Triassic to Early Jurassic in Africa, Antarctica, Asia, and the Americas. Massospondylids have been recovered as the sister group (most closely related group) to more derived sauropodomorphs, including Sauropoda itself, and more derived than groups like Plateosauridae. In their 2007 phylogenetic analysis of the relationships of Glacialisaurus, Smith and Pol found that it was a massospondylid. Features of its foot are similar to Lufengosaurus (from the Early Jurassic of China), and the phylogenetic study suggested that these dinosaurs were close relatives, whereas Massospondylus was found to be a more basal form. This has been supported by later analyses, including Müller (2019) which found it in a clade with Coloradisaurus and Lufengosaurus, while Massospondylus, Sarahsaurus, Pradhania, and Xingxiulong were more basal in the family.

The paleontologist Oliver W. M. Rauhut and colleagues found Lufengosaurus tobe the sister taxon of Glacialisaurus in 2020, and the following cladogram shows the placement they recovered for Glacialisaurus within the sauropodomorph group Massopoda:

The discovery of Glacialisaurus is important to the study of the early distribution of sauropod dinosaurs. The presence of this primitive sauropodomorph in the Hanson Formation (which has also yielded remains attributed to true sauropods) shows that both primitive and advanced members of this lineage existed side by side in the early Jurassic Period.

Paleoenvironment 

Glacialisaurus is known from the Hanson Formation, which is one of only two major dinosaur-bearing rock formations found on Antarctica. The specimens were discovered in tuffaceous siltstone deposited in the Sinemurian to Pliensbachian stage of the Early Jurassic, dating to about 194-188 million years ago. The high altitude of this site supports the idea that early Jurassic Antarctica had forests populated by a diverse range of species, at least along the coast. The Hanson Formation was deposited in an active volcano−tectonic rift system formed during the breakup of the supercontinent Gondwana. Local volcanism and evidence of wildfires is known from some paleobotanical sites in the Hanson Formation.

Models of Jurassic air flow indicate that coastal areas probably never dropped much below freezing, although more extreme conditions existed inland. This formation has yielded the remains of the large theropod Cryolophosaurus, a crow-sized dimorphodontid pterosaur, a rat-sized tritylodont synapsid, and two small unnamed sauropodomorphs. Many plant genera have also been recovered from the Shafer Peak section of the Hanson Formation that suggest forests similar to the open woodlands of North Island, New Zealand. Known plants include Cheirolepidiaceaen conifers, Equisetites horsetails, and Cladophlebis ferns that have also been found or are similar to plants found in other Early Jurassic sites that represent warm climates. Basal sauropodomorphs like Glacialisaurus were the first  very large dinosaurs and, due to their height, the first herbivores to high browse.

See also 

 List of Australian and Antarctic dinosaurs
 South Polar region of the Cretaceous

References 

Massospondylidae
Dinosaurs of Antarctica
Early Jurassic dinosaurs
Jurassic Antarctica
Fossil taxa described in 2007
Pliensbachian genera